Shermanville Township is one of the thirteen townships of Sherman County, Kansas, United States.  The population was 51 at the 2000 census.

Geography
Located in the northern part of the county, it borders the following townships:
Bird City Township, Cheyenne County — north
Llanos Township — east
Union Township — southeastern corner
Washington Township — south
Voltaire Township — west
It lies northeast of the county seat of Goodland.  There are no communities in the township.

The intermittent Sappa and Beaver creeks flow through Shermanville Township.

Transportation
Only local roads are located in Shermanville Township.

Government
Shermanville Township is currently inactive; by Kansas law, when a township becomes inactive, its powers and duties revert to the county government.

References

External links
County website

Townships in Sherman County, Kansas
Townships in Kansas